Bishop Hall may refer to:

People
Joseph Hall (bishop) (1574–1656), English bishop, satirist and moralist
Ronald Hall (1890–1975), Anglican bishop

Buildings
Bishop Hall Jubilee School, Hong Kong
Hatfield College, originally called Bishop Hatfield's Hall
Bishop Hall (Miami University)

Architectural disambiguation pages